KFOG KaBoom was an annual outdoor concert held by KFOG in San Francisco and which occurred in May from 1994 to 2010. It was followed by a fireworks show synchronized to a soundtrack broadcast by the station. The extravagant fireworks display drew over 350,000 people.  In 2007, KaBoom began charging admission due to rising costs.

Through 1998, the event was known as the Sky Concert, but was renamed in 1999. Reportedly, this was due to the name being too generic  and may conflict with Keilwerth S.K.Y. Concert Saxophones.

In 2010, the Port of San Francisco informed KFOG that Piers 30/32 in downtown San Francisco could no longer support the heavy equipment and vehicles necessary to produce large events. In May of that same year, KaBoom was moved from the pier location to the parking lot of Candlestick Park.

In the spring of 2011, KFOG announced that a proper venue for the show could not be found, and that KaBoom for 2011 was cancelled.  No announcement has since been made for KaBoom since 2012. KFOG itself would sign off in September 2019, ending any chances of a reboot for the event.

Artist Lineup:

1994 (Sky Concert) - The Subdudes, NRBQ
1995 (Sky Concert) - Timbuk3, The Freddy Jones Band
1996 (Sky Concert) - The Odds, Robben Ford and The Blue Line
1997 (Sky Concert) - The Odds, Wilco, Keb' Mo'
1998 (Sky Concert) - Pete Droge, The Scott Thomas Ban, Roomful of Blues
1999 - Wes Cunningham, The Boneshakers, Wilco
2000 - Pat McGee Band, Shannon Curfman, Kenny Wayne Shepherd
2001 - Old 97's, Mother Hips, Blues Traveler
2002 - Zero 7, Robert Bradley's Blackwater Surprise, Boz Scaggs
2003 - Keller Williams, Nickel Creek, Susan Tedeschi, Steve Winwood
2004 - Train, The Waifs, Robert Randolph & the Family Band
2005 - John Butler Trio, Kathleen Edwards, Wallflowers
2006 - Jackie Greene, KT Tunstall, Los Lonely Boys
2007 - Ozomatli, Guster, Kenny Wayne Shepherd
2008 - Collective Soul, Los Lobos, Matt Nathanson
2009 - Chuck Prophet, Los Lonely Boys, Susan Tedeschi
2010 - Melissa Etheridge, John Butler Trio, Grace Potter and the Nocturnals

References

External links
KaBoom on KFOG's website
KFOG KaBoom "buzz" at Yelp
SFMTA  >  Transit >  Updates
KFOG KaBoom @ sf.funcheap.com
extra Caltrain service for KFOG KaBoom

Music festivals in California
Music festivals established in 1994
1994 establishments in California
Festivals in the San Francisco Bay Area